Marie Ancilla Ntakaburimvo is a Burundian lawyer and judge who was the president of the Supreme Court of Burundi. She was appointed to the position by President Pierre Nkurunziza on the recommendation of Minister of Justice and Keeper of the Seals on 4 March 2006 succeeding Adrien Nyankiye in that office. She served in this position until 2011, when she was appointed Minister of Justice and Keeper of the Seals. President Nkurunziza sacked her from her mistrial post a few months after the appointment along with five other cabinet members for poor performance in November 2011.

References 

Burundian politicians
Burundian judges
Burundian lawyers
Living people
Year of birth missing (living people)